Duane C. Carter Jr. (born June 11, 1950), nicknamed "Pancho", is a retired American race car driver. He is most famous for his participation in CART Indy car races. He won the pole position for the 1985 Indianapolis 500, finished third in the 1982 race, and won the 1981 Michigan 500.

Personal life
He is the son of Indycar racer Duane Carter. He was born while his parents were on the way to a race at the Milwaukee Mile. His father's nickname was "Pappy". Pappy referred to his wife's pregnancy as "little paunch," so they nicknamed the child Pancho. Carter is the half-brother of Johnny Parsons. His full brother, Dana Carter, also raced in USAC midgets, sprints and Silver Crown. He died of a heart attack in the early 1980s.

Carter is a graduate of California State University, Long Beach. He is married, to Carla; they have two children, and their son Cole is an aspiring racer.

Racing career

Midget cars
Carter's national career began while racing in a midget car. He won the 1972 USAC midget car championship. He won the 1972 and 1975 Hut Hundred. He had 23 midget car feature wins by the time  he left the series in 1978.

Sprint cars
Carter won the 1974 and 1976 national USAC sprint car championships. He was the first driver to win the two USAC championships – midgets and sprint cars. He has wins in three USAC divisions – midgets, sprints and Silver Crown (formerly known as dirt cars).

On May 30, 1977, Carter won two USAC Midget features, one USAC sprint feature and finished second in the second USAC sprint feature at Salem Speedway on a day the temperatures were near 100 degrees. This was one day after he finished 15th in the Indianapolis 500.

Carter ran well on dirt and pavement, but was exceptional on the paved high banks at Winchester and Salem, Indianapolis, and Dayton, Ohio. He won the Joe James/Pat O'Conner Memorial race at the half-mile at Salem, Indiana, on four consecutive occasions.

Carter was seriously injured during a testing crash at Phoenix International Speedway in November 1977. The injuries left him with a permanent disability in one of his legs that hampered his ability to perform well on road courses. He still ran very well on ovals. He made his return to racing at the end of March in 1978, winning a USAC Sprint race at the paved five-eighths mile Indianapolis Raceway Park on Saturday night and at the high-banked half-mile Winchester Speedway the next day – his first races back in the cockpit of a racecar.

Carter was inducted in the National Midget Auto Racing Hall of Fame in 1990, and the National Sprint Car Hall of Fame in 1991.

Indy cars
Carter drove his first Indianapolis 500 in 1974. He finished seventh, and was awarded the Rookie of the Year. In 1981 he finished third in the CART championship and captured his only Indy Car win at Michigan International Speedway. He finished third in the 1982 Indianapolis 500 behind the now-famous duel between Gordon Johncock and Rick Mears.  In 1985, Carter drove the brand new Buick V6 engine to the pole position of the 1985 Indianapolis 500. He retired with mechanical problems after completing just six laps, becoming the first pole-sitter since Cliff Woodbury to finish dead-last. His last year as a full-time Indy Car driver was 1990 and his last appearance in an indy car was failing to qualify for the 1994 Indianapolis 500. In more recent years, Carter has served as a spotter for Sam Hornish Jr., Vítor Meira, Dillon Battistini, Dan Wheldon, Martin Plowman and Adrián Campos Jr. In 2019, he was the spotter for rookie Santino Ferrucci, who finished seventh, as the Rookie of the Year, at the Indianapolis 500. This was the same as Carter in his 500 debut.

NASCAR

From 1985–1995 Carter ran 14 NASCAR Winston Cup Series races for multiple owners. His first start was at Darlington Raceway in 1985, which was the Southern 500. The race was best known for Bill Elliott locking up the Winston Million, Carter finished in 22nd. Carter began the 1986 season driving for Elmo Langley; at the 1986 Daytona 500, he and Kyle Petty were involved in a turn one accident, thus winding up in 34th place. After three races with Langley's team, he moved to driving for Roger Hamby, competing in six more races that year; he posted his best career NASCAR finish with Hamby, a seventeenth-place finish at the Michigan International Speedway. In 1990, he competed at Atlanta Motor Speedway, driving for Paul Romine; he drove for Donlavey Racing at Charlotte Motor Speedway in 1992, and his final two races in Winston Cup competition came for Triad Motorsports at Atlanta Motor Speedway in 1994, where he tied his career-best finish, and Pocono Raceway in 1995.

In 1995, Pancho also raced two Craftsman Truck Series races, driving for Enerjetix Motorsports.

Post-racing career
Carter currently acts as a spotter for Dale Coyne Racing.

Motorsports career results

American open-wheel racing
(key) (Races in bold indicate pole position)

USAC Champ Car/Gold Crown Series

PPG Indycar Series

Indianapolis 500

NASCAR
(key) (Bold – Pole position awarded by qualifying time. Italics – Pole position earned by points standings or practice time. * – Most laps led.)

Winston Cup Series

SuperTruck Series

References

External links

1950 births
Living people
People from Brownsburg, Indiana
Racing drivers from Indiana
Champ Car drivers
Indianapolis 500 drivers
Indianapolis 500 polesitters
Indianapolis 500 Rookies of the Year
NASCAR drivers
National Sprint Car Hall of Fame inductees
American Speed Association drivers
California State University, Long Beach alumni
USAC Silver Crown Series drivers
A. J. Foyt Enterprises drivers